A sugar baby is a person supported (typically financially and materially) by an older companion.

Sugar Baby or Sugar Babies may refer to:

 the term of endearment
 "Sugar Baby" (song), a 2001 song by Bob Dylan
 Sugarbaby (EP), 2008 EP by Morningwood
 Suga BayBee, radio host persona of Sugar Lyn Beard (born 1981)
 Sugar Babies (candy),  caramel sweets 
 Sugar Babies (musical), a 1979 Broadway musical
 The Sugar Babies, a 2007 documentary film 
 Sugarbaby (film), aka Zuckerbaby, by Percy Adlon
 "Sugar Baby", a song by Megan Thee Stallion from the 2020 album Good News

See also
 Age disparity in sexual relationships
 Client (prostitution)
 Enjo kōsai
 Gigolo
 Girlfriend experience
 Gold digger
 MillionaireMatch  - a dating dating app
 Mistress (lover)
 Prostitution
 SeekingArrangement - a sugar dating dating app
 Sugababes, an English girl group
 Sugar dating
 Sugarbook  - a sugar dating dating app
 Transactional sex
 Treating (dating)
 Trophy wife